This is a list of Belgian television related events from 1995.

Events
12 March - Frédéric Etherlinck is selected to represent Belgium at the 1995 Eurovision Song Contest with his song "La voix est libre". He is selected to be the thirty-ninth Belgian Eurovision entry during Eurosong held at the RTBF Studios in Brussels.
22 September - The seventh season of VTM Soundmixshow is won by George Darmoise, performing as Tom Jones.

Debuts

23 December - Thuis (1995–present)

Television shows

1990s
Samson en Gert (1990–present)
Familie (1991–present)
Wittekerke (1993-2008)

Ending this year

VTM Soundmixshow (1989-1995, 1997-2000)

Births

Deaths

References